Serinethinae is a subfamily of the hemipteran family Rhopalidae, sometimes known as soapberry bugs. They are brightly colored seed-eaters, comprising three genera and about sixty-five species. These bugs are specialists on plants in the soapberry family (Sapindaceae), which includes maples, balloon vines, and soapberry trees, among others. Seeds of the plants are the main resource used by adults for reproduction and nymphs for growth and development.  Their diversity is the result of an adaptive radiation on these plants, whose cyanide-based defenses the bugs have overcome. The New World genus Jadera consists of nearly 20 species that range naturally from Kansas to southern Argentina. Boisea consists of 4 species, 1 in Africa, 1 in India, and 2 in North America, including the well-known box elder bug, Boisea trivittata. Leptocoris includes more than 60 species, in Oceania, Australia, Asia, and Africa.

Jadera haematoloma is a soapberry bug found in Florida known for its rapid adaptive evolution following the introduction of a non-native soapberry plant.

References

External links
 Online guide to soapberry bugs

 
Rhopalidae